Group B of the 2005 FIFA Confederations Cup took place between 16 June and 22 June 2005. Mexico won the group, and advanced to the second round, along with Brazil. Japan and Greece failed to advance.

Standings

Matches

Japan v Mexico

Man of the Match:
Sinha (Mexico)

Assistant referees:
Matthew Cream (Australia)
Jim Ouliaris (Australia)
Fourth official:
Carlos Chandía (Chile)

Brazil v Greece

Man of the Match:
Robinho (Brazil)

Assistant referees:
Roman Slyško (Slovakia)
Martin Balko (Slovakia)
Fourth official:
Shamsul Maidin (Singapore)

Greece v Japan

Man of the Match:
Shunsuke Nakamura (Japan)

Assistant referees:
Carsten Kadach (Germany)
Volker Wezel (Germany)
Fourth official:
Carlos Amarilla (Paraguay)

Mexico v Brazil

Man of the Match:
Oswaldo Sánchez (Mexico)

Assistant referees:
Alessandro Griselli (Italy)
Cristiano Copelli (Italy)
Fourth official:
Carlos Chandía (Chile)

Greece v Mexico

Man of the Match:
Oswaldo Sánchez (Mexico)

Assistant referees:
Amelio Andino (Paraguay)
Manuel Bernal (Paraguay)
Fourth official:
Manuel Mejuto González (Spain)

Japan v Brazil

Man of the Match:
Shunsuke Nakamura (Japan)

Assistant referees:
Taoufik Adjengui (Tunisia)
Ali Tomusange (Uganda)
Fourth official:
Shamsul Maidin (Singapore)

References

B
2004–05 in Greek football
2004–05 in Mexican football
Group
2005 in Japanese football